Friedrich Konrad Müller (born November 14, 1823 Ummerstadt; † 26 April 1881 in Leipzig) was a German poet, journalist and physician. He called himself Müller von der Werra.

Life
Müller was the son of a farmer. He became an apprentice pharmacist in Hildburghausen in and the mid-forties, he went to Heidelberg, where he met the poet Wilhelmine von Chézy, which supported him financially and encouraged his first works.

Because of his participation in the revolution of March 1848, he had to flee to Switzerland, and studied medicine in Zurich and Bern. Other cities were Geneva and St. Gallen. Then he returned to his homeland, going to Camburg in Thuringia, Weimar, Coburg and Gotha. In 1869 Müller as an honorary guest of the Khedive at the opening of the Suez Canal. In 1871 Müller became an honorary doctorate from the University of Jena, and a year later, an honorary citizen of his native city.

Works (selection)
The liberty miracle horn or Rothe roses and sword sound. A. See Biel 1850 (poems).
A German oak ring. 1857 (poems).
St. John's dream. 1860 (story).
Thuringia. 1861 (guidebook).
Ererbt und ergerbt. 1871 (story).

References

External links
Julius Riffert: Müller, Friedrich Konrad. In: Allgemeine Deutsche Biographie (ADB). Vol. 22, Duncker & Humblot, Leipzig 1885, pp. 702–704. 

1823 births
1881 deaths
19th-century German poets
German male poets
19th-century German male writers
19th-century German writers